The Wooden Church was a church in Dumuslău, Romania, built in 1792 and demolished in 1935.

References

External links
 Târnosirea bisericii din Dumuslău

Bibliography 
 Leontin Ghergariu (14 August 1976). „Biserici de lemn din Sălaj”. manuscris în Arhivele Naționale din Zalău, colecția personală Leontin Ghergariu (actul 11 din 1976).

Wooden churches in Sălaj County
Buildings and structures demolished in 1935
Greek-Catholic churches in Romania
18th-century Catholic church buildings